Vanke is a large residential real estate developer in China. It is engaged in developing, managing and selling properties across more than 60 mainland Chinese cities in the Pearl River Delta, Yangtze River Delta and Bohai-Rim Region, with the provision of investment, trading, consultancy services and e-business. It also has expanded into Hong Kong, the United States, the United Kingdom, and Malaysia since 2012. Its largest shareholder is Shenzhen Metro.

It is headquartered in Vanke Center in Dameisha, Yantian District, Shenzhen, Guangdong province.

Vanke was listed on the Shenzhen Stock Exchange in 1991, the second listed company in the Shenzhen Stock Exchange after Shenzhen Development Bank. It had the largest market capitalisation in 2006 on the Shenzhen Stock Exchange.

As of 2020, Vanke is ranked 208th in the Fortune Global 500. Fortune reported the company having US$53.253 billion in revenue, US$248.360 billion worth of assets, and 131,505 employees that year.

Vanke was also ranked 96th in the Forbes Global 2000 in 2020.

As of 21 February 2019 its market cap is US$44 billion.

See also
Real estate in China

References

 
Companies in the CSI 100 Index
Real estate companies of China
Companies based in Shenzhen
China Resources
Companies listed on the Hong Kong Stock Exchange
Companies listed on the Shenzhen Stock Exchange
Real estate companies established in 1984
Chinese companies established in 1984
Chinese brands